The Wood Site is an archaeological site located in Hayes Township in Charlevoix County, Michigan. It was listed on the National Register of Historic Places in 1976.

The Wood Site was a seasonally occupied fishing camp used during the Late Woodland period, from about AD 1020-AD 1510.

References

National Register of Historic Places in Charlevoix County, Michigan
Archaeological sites on the National Register of Historic Places in Michigan